Jahid Ali (born 5 March 1995) is a Pakistani first-class cricketer who plays for Karachi. In October 2017, he was named in Pakistan's squad for the 2017 Hong Kong Cricket Sixes.

References

External links
 

1995 births
Living people
Pakistani cricketers
Karachi cricketers
Cricketers from Karachi